The Gold Racket is a 1937 American crime film directed by Louis J. Gasnier and written by David S. Levy. The film stars Conrad Nagel, Eleanor Hunt, in the third of their "G-Man" film series as well as Fuzzy Knight, Frank Milan, Jack Duffy and Albert J. Smith. The film was released on April 10, 1937, by Grand National Films Inc.

Plot
The story follows Alan and Bobbie as they accept a request from the Mexican Government to stop the operations of a gang that is smuggling gold from México to the U.S and then selling it to the U.S Government.

Cast            
Conrad Nagel as Alan O'Connor
Eleanor Hunt as Bobbie Reynolds
Fuzzy Knight as Scotty Summers
Frank Milan as Steve Williams
Jack Duffy as Hinkle
Albert J. Smith as Fraser
Warner Richmond as Doc Johnson
Charles Delaney as Joe
Karl Hackett as Lefty
William L. Thorne as McKenzie
Edward LeSaint as Dixon

References

External links
 

1937 films
American black-and-white films
American crime films
1937 crime films
Grand National Films films
Films directed by Louis J. Gasnier
1930s English-language films
1930s American films